Deep cement mixing (DCM) is a civil engineering deep foundation technique where a binder material, typically cement, is injected into the ground for ground stabilization and land reclamation. In ground stabilization applications it is typically used to obtain a better load bearing capability of the existing soil, e.g. in order to bear buildings and other structures. In land reclamation applications it is typically used when cheaper techniques such as dredging or draining cannot be applied because of environmental concerns due to contaminated soil that these two techniques would release. The expansion of the Hong Kong International Airport and Tokyo's Haneda Airport are examples of this.

Deep cement mixing was first developed in Japan where first field tests began in 1970. Originally granular quicklime was used as binder to stabilize the underlying soil, but soon better results were obtained using cement slurry and cement mortar. Until the end of the 1980s, DCM was used only in Japan and Scandinavia. Since then it has gained popularity also in the United States and Europe.

Deep cement mixing involves first extracting soil from the ground into which binder material is later to be injected. Typically this is done with an auger type machine in order to penetrate deeply but narrowly into the soil. Upon reaching the required depth, cement or sometimes another binder material is injected into the excavated hole. As the soil is soft, the binder material mixes with the soil diffusing back into the excavated hole, so it is important to choose a binder material appropriate for the specific soil, although in the vast majority of cases, cement works well. As the cement-soil mix begins to harden, further cement is added on top of the growing column until the column reaches all the way up to the start. During this process further excavation of the diffusing soil may be required. Finally the machinery is moved to the location of the next column where the process is repeated in order to form another column. Once fully hardened these columns are then able to bear much higher loads than the seabed (when using the technique to reclaim land) or the typically soft soil upon which one wants to build.

References

External links
 Part of Report of DCM used in Tokyo
 Hong Kong Airport Technical Report
 Video containing an animation of deep cement mixing as used in Hong Kong

Deep foundations